Anna Vasilyevna Kovaleva (born 18 January 1983) is a Russian former artistic gymnast. She was a member of the silver medal-winning team at the 1999 World Artistic Gymnastics Championships.

After retiring from competitions she works as gymnastics coach in Zelenograd.

External links

Anna Kovalyova (RUS) at Gymn Forum

References

Russian female artistic gymnasts
Medalists at the World Artistic Gymnastics Championships
1983 births
Living people
People from Novgorod Oblast